Eric Lichtenstein (born 6 October 1994) is a racing driver from Argentina.

Career

Karting
Born in Buenos Aires, Lichtenstein began his karting career at the age of ten. He raced primarily in his native Argentina up to 2011, becoming a champion in various regional karting championships.

Early career
In 2011, Lichtenstein graduated to single-seaters, racing in the Fórmula Metropolitana series. He also competed in the newly created Formula Pilota China championship.

Formula Ford
For the next year, Lichtenstein moved to Europe to compete in the British Formula Ford Championship with Jamun Racing, with the support of Velociudad Driver Management, who signed him as their first driver for their program designed to support young Argentine talents. He dominated the second half of the season, winning eleven races total and ultimately finishing third overall in the championship.

GP3 Series
Lichtenstein will step up to the GP3 Series with Carlin in 2013. After the race at the Hungaroring his contract with Carlin has been terminated by the team due to non-payment of outstanding driver fees by Velociudad Driver Management.

Personal
Lichtenstein is Jewish

Racing record

Career summary

Complete GP3 Series results
(key) (Races in bold indicate pole position) (Races in italics indicate fastest lap)

References

External links
 
 
 

1994 births
Living people
Argentine Jews
Jewish Argentine sportspeople
Racing drivers from Buenos Aires
Formula Ford drivers
Formula Masters China drivers
Argentine GP3 Series drivers
Carlin racing drivers
Asia Racing Team drivers